The 1996–97 Deportivo Toluca F.C. season was the 90th season in the football club's history and the 44th consecutive season in the top flight of Mexican football.

Players

Squad information

Players and squad numbers last updated on 28 December 2018.Note: Flags indicate national team as has been defined under FIFA eligibility rules. Players may hold more than one non-FIFA nationality.

Competitions

Overview

Torneo Invierno

League table

Results summary

Result round by round

Matches

Liguilla

Quarter-finals

Torneo Verano

League table

Results summary

Result round by round

Matches

Copa México

Group stage

Statistics

Goals

Own goals

Clean sheets

References

1996–97 Mexican Primera División season
1996–97 in Mexican football
Deportivo Toluca F.C. seasons